Erik Håkan Hellqvist (born 1927) is a Finnish diplomat. He was the Consul General of Finland in Gothenburg from March 1, 1973, to 1977 and Finnish Ambassador to Lusaka from 1980 to 1983. From 1984 to 1988 he was a negotiating officer from the Ministry for Foreign Affairs, from 1988 to 1989, Ambassador to Kuala Lumpur and again from 1989 the State Secretary for Negotiation.

References

Ambassadors of Finland to Zambia
Ambassadors of Finland to Malaysia
1927 births
Living people
Finnish expatriates in Sweden